20 Weeks is a 2017 American romantic drama film written and directed by Leena Pendharkar and starring Amir Arison and Anna Margaret Hollyman.

Cast
Anna Margaret Hollyman as Maya
Amir Arison as Ronan
Michelle Krusiec as Dr. Chen
Sujata Day as Ruby
Jocelin Donahue as Eileen

Release
The film premiered at the LA Film Festival on June 19, 2017.

Reception
The film has a 60% rating on Rotten Tomatoes based on five reviews.

Kimber Myers of the Los Angeles Times gave the film a positive review, describing it as "compelling if difficult viewing for anyone interested in seeing a variety of parental experiences on screen."

Alan Ng of Film Threat awarded the film four stars out of five and wrote, "20 Weeks is a series of real moments accentuated with authentic dialogue. Situations and setting feel spontaneous and not staged."

The Hollywood Reporter gave the film a negative review: "Attractive and capably acted but oddly airless, the drama is a downer without offering much reward for our time."

References

External links